Pennsylvania Rail Trails are former railway lines that have been converted to paths designed for pedestrian, bicycle, skating, equestrian, or light motorized traffic. Rail trails are multi-use paths offering, at a minimum, a combination of pedestrian and cycle recreation.

Trails beginning from A to E
A
Allegheny Portage Railroad Trail
Allegheny Valley River Trail
Arboretum Trail
Armstrong Trail
Arrowhead Trail, Washington County
B 
Back Mountain Trail
Beaver River Trail
Bellefonte Central Rail Trail
Bristol Spurline Park Trail
Buffalo Valley Rail Trail
Butler-Freeport Community Trail
C 
Chester Valley Trail
Clarion Highlands Trail
Clarion - Little Toby Creek Trail
Clearfield to Grampian Trail
Conestoga Greenway Trail
Conewago Recreation Trail
Corry Junction Greenway Trail
Cumberland County Biker/Hiker Trail
Cumberland Valley Rail Trail
Cynwyd Heritage Trail
D 
D&H Trail
D&L Trail
Dimeling to Madera Trail
E 
East Branch Trail
Endless Mountain Riding Trail
Ernst Bike Trail

Trails beginning from F to M
F
Five Star Trail
Forks Township Recreational Trail
G 
Ghost Town Trail
Great Allegheny Passage
Greene River Trail
H 
Harmony Trail
Hike & Bike Trail
Hoodlebug Trail
Hoover-Mason Trestle
Houtzdale Line Trail
Huntingdon and Broad Top Trail
I 
Indian Creek Valley Trail
Ironton Rail-trail
J 
James Mayer Riverwalk
JFK Walking Trail
John B. Bartram Trail
K 
Kellettville To Nebraska Trail
Knox & Kane Rail Trail
L 
Lancaster Junction Trail
Lebanon Valley Rail Trail
Lehigh & New England Trail
Lehigh Gorge Trail
LeTort Spring Run Nature Trail
Liberty Bell Trail
Lower Trail
Luzerne County Rail Trail
Lycoming Creek Bikeway
M 
Mahoning Shadow Trail
Montour Trail

Trails beginning from N to Z
N 
Nor-Bath Trail
O 
O&W Rail Trail
Ohio River Trail
P 
Palmer Bikeway
Panhandle Trail
Penns Creek Path
Pennypack Trail
Perkiomen Trail
Phoenix Iron Canal Trail
Pine Creek Rail Trail
Plainfield Township Trail
R 
Radnor Trail
Railroad Grade Trail
Roaring Run Trail
Rotary Walk Trail
S 
Samuel Justus Recreational Trail
Sandy Creek Trail
Schuylkill River Trail
Sewickley Creek Trail
Snow Shoe Trail
Stavich Bike Trail
Stony Valley Railroad Grade
Struble Trail
Susquehanna Warrior Trail
Switchback Railroad Trail
T 
Tidioute Riverside Rec Trek Trail
Towpath Bike Trail
Tredway Trail
Trolley Trail
W 
Warren to North Warren Bike Trail
Warwick-to-Ephrata Rail Trail
West Penn Trail
Westmoreland Heritage Trail
Wynn & Clara Tredway River Park
Y 
York County Heritage Rail Trail

References

External links
PA DCNR trail page
RailsToTrails.us Pennsylvania rail trails

Rail trails in Pennsylvania